Knives is the fourth studio album by American punk rock band Aiden.

Recording and composition
On January 15, 2009, it was announced that the band had begun recording their next album. It was recorded and produced by WiL at his own studio, Sleepy Hollow, in Seattle. The album is a return to Aiden's horror punk style, after the lighter style of the album Conviction.

Release
On March 14, 2009, Knives was announced for release in May. On April 1, "Scavengers of the Damned" was announced as the first single from the album and was made available to buy on iTunes as well as uploaded to the band's MySpace page. The album was released on May 11 in the UK and a day later in the US through Victory Records. The band has described this album as, "raw, it's fast, it's pissed". Between late June and late August, the band performed on the Warped Tour.

Track listing

Personnel

Aiden
 Wil Francis – vocals, production, engineering, mixing, collage art
 Angel Ibarra – guitars, production
 Nick Wiggins – bass guitar, production
 Jake Davison – drums, production

Production and additional personnel
 Justin Armstrong – production, engineering, mixing
 Ryann Donnelly – backing vocals; vocals (on "Portrait")
 Rick Kern – backing vocals
 Jeremy Beddingfield – backing vocals
 Anna Ivarra – backing vocals, photography
 Chad Michael Ward – artwork
 Doublej – artwork
 Michael Cortada – logo

Chart positions

References

2009 albums
Victory Records albums
Aiden albums